Ro or RO may refer to:

Organizations
 Ro (company), an American telehealth company
 Red Orchestra (espionage), a series of Soviet spy rings
 Reserve Officers' Training Corps, an American armed forces training program
 Royal Ordnance, a British armaments manufacturer
 Reach Out (non-profit), an Australian information website
 TAROM, a Romanian airline

Places
 Rø, Denmark
 Ro, Emilia-Romagna, Italy
 Ro, Greece, a small Greek island
 Rö Church, in Stockholm County, Sweden
 Romania (ISO 3166-1 country code RO)
 Rondônia, Brazil

Science and technology
 .ro, the top level internet domain for Romania
 Ro (antigen)
 Autoantigen Ro, a protein
 Ro (volume), an Egyptian unit of measurement
 Radio occultation, a technique for measuring the properties of an atmosphere
 Reactor operator, a person who controls a nuclear reactor
 Relaxation oscillator, an electronic oscillator
 Reverse osmosis, a filtration method
 Read-only access, a computer software attribute
 Receive only, a type of teleprinter
 Right only, a method of manipulating stereophonic sound

Other
 Ro (language), an a priori constructed language
 Ro (kana), a Japanese character
 Ro (title), a Fijian title of nobility
 Ro (video game), a 2008 IOS puzzle game
 Romanian language
 Ro (dubious Danish king)
 Ro (pharaoh) (fl. 32nd century BC), Egyptian pharaoh
 Ro (name)
 Renewables Obligation (United Kingdom), a British order requiring renewable electricity generation
 Restraining order, a legal injunction
 A shortened variety of the first name Rohit
 Residentie Orchestra, Dutch Orchestra based in Den Haag
Rogue One, a 2016 Star Wars film

See also
 R0 (disambiguation)
 Rho (disambiguation)
 ROH (disambiguation)
 Roll-on/roll-off, ships designed to carry wheeled cargo